Maxwell V L Barclay FRES is a British entomologist, and Curator and Collections Manager of Coleoptera and Hemiptera at the Natural History Museum in London. He is a Fellow of the Royal Entomological Society, and a member of the editorial board of The Coleopterist journal. He has been described as ‘one of Britain’s leading entomologists’.

Career
Barclay is one of the four virtual ‘Scientist Guides’ of the Natural History Museum’s new Darwin Centre and was among the group that showed the building to Prince William at its 2009 opening. He is a frequent public speaker and media spokesman for entomology and for the Museum, most notably appearing in three of the six episodes of the 2010 BBC Series Museum of Life presented by Jimmy Doherty. He believes that public speaking is important 'to enthuse the next generation of scientists and naturalists, and to legitimise what we do in the eyes of the public'. In 2016 he gave the Royal Entomological Society's Verrall Lecture speaking on 'Collections: the last great frontiers of exploration'. In 2008 he was involved in the identification of a species of bug new to Britain in the Museum’s garden.

Barclay is best known for his work on beetles (Coleoptera), and is author of scientific papers and co-editor of a text book on the subject. He worked as a volunteer in the Department of Entomology for several years before being offered the post of Curator in 2001. The collection of the Natural History Museum that he manages includes more than 20,000 drawers of beetles, including specimens collected by Joseph Banks, Charles Darwin and Alfred Russel Wallace. He has travelled extensively in search of specimens, including to Bolivia, Peru, Taiwan and Thailand, and has discovered new species.

Recognition
94 beetle species have been named in his honour by fellow scientists, including:

Carabidae
 Goniotropis barclayi Deuve, 2005 
 Platynus barclayi Schmidt, 2009
 Orictites barclayi Balkenohl, 2017
 Brachinus barclayi Hrdlička, 2019
Hydrophilidae
 Berosus barclayi Ponomarenko & Soriano, 2019 (Upper Eocene fossil)
Ptiliidae
 Acrotrichis barclayi Darby, 2014
Staphylinidae
 Naddia barclayi Rougemont, 2016
 Asimos barclayi Chatzimanolis, 2023
Scarabaeidae
 Ixorida (Pseudomecinonota) barclayi Legrand, 2008
 Gynaecoserica barclayi Ahrens, 2009
 Clinterocera barclayi Legrand & Chew, 2010
 Copris (Sinocopris) barclayi Ochi, 2010
 Protaetia (Macroprotaetia) maxwelli Jakl, 2011
 Madecorphnus barclayi Frolov, 2012
 Onthophagus maxwellianus Moretto, 2013
 Mesomerodon barclayi Seidel, Jameson & Stone, 2017
 Wernoryctes barclayi Takano, 2020
Cantharidae
 Themus (Haplothemus) barclayi Svihla, 2006
Heteroceridae
 Tropicus maxwelli Skalicky, 2010
Limnichidae
 Phalacrichus max Ribera & Hernando, 2001
Throscidae
 Trixagus barclayi Kirejtshuk, 2019 (Upper Eocene fossil)
Eucnemidae
 Bioxylus barclayi Otto, 2016
Elateridae
 Athous barclayi Platia, 2010
Ptinidae
 Clada barclayi Zahradník & Trýzna, 2018
Dermestidae
 Orphinus barclayi Hava & Matsumoto, 2021 
 Anthrenus barclayi Háva, 2019
 Thaumaglossa barclayi Kadej and Háva, 2015
Scirtidae
 Scirtes maxi Yoshitomi & Ruta, 2010
 Cyphon barclayi Yoshitomi, 2012
Psephenidae
 Falsodrupeus barclayi Lee, 2011
 Homoeogenus barclayi Lee, 2016
Buprestidae
 Endelus barclayi Kalashian, 2011
 Aphanisticus barclayi Kalashian & Kubáň, 2014
 Sphenoptera barclayi Kalashian, 2017
Lycidae
 Sulabanus barclayi Dvorak & Bocak, 2007
 Alyculus barclayi Palata & Bocak, 2012
Coccinellidae
 Serratibia barclayi Gordon, Canepari & Hanley, 2013
Helotidae
 Neohelota barclayi Lee, 2015
Nitidulidae
 Pocadius barclayi Cline, 2005
Latridiidae
 Cartodere barclayi Rücker, 2012
Aderidae
 Zarcosia barclayi Gompel, 2020
Anthicidae
 Tomoderus barclayi Telnov, 2005
 Macratria maxbarclayi Telnov, 2011
Ischaliidae
 Ischalia barclayi Young, 2011
Tenebrionidae
 Eurychora barclayi Ferrer, 2003
 Amarygmus barclayi Bremer, 2004
 Pseudopodhomala barclayi Medvedev, 2004
 Ulomina barclayi Grimm, 2004
 Enicmosoma barclayi Ferrer, 2005
 Tauroceras barclayi Ferrer, Soldati & Delatour, 2005
 Chariotheca barclayi Masumoto 2006
 Goniadera barclayi Ferrer, 2007
 Pseudonautes barclayi Ando, 2007
 Laena barclayi Schawaller, 2009
 Othryoneus barclayi Ferrer, 2010
 Phylan barclayi Ferrer, 2010
 Hexarhopalus (Leprocaulus) barclayi Purchart, 2010
 Phymatosoma barclayi Masumoto & Akita, 2010
 Blaps barclayi Martínez-Fernández & Ferrer, 2012
 Rhyzodina barclayi Ferrer, 2015
 Stenochinus barclayi Masumoto & Akita, 2019
 Toktokkus barclayi Kamiński & Gearner, 2020
Oedemeridae
 Nacerdes (Xanthochroa) apicipennis barclayi Svihla, 2011
Cerambycidae
 Trypogeus barclayi Vives, 2007
 Melanesiandra barclayi Santos-Silva, 2011
 Acutandra barclayi Bouyer, Drumont & Santos-Silva, 2012
 Colobeutrypanus barclayi Monné & Monné, 2012
 Clytellus barclayi Miroshnikov, 2014
 Oncideres barclayi Nearns & Tavakilian, 2015 
 Parandra barclayi Santos-Silva, 2015
 Triammatus barclayi Jiroux, 2016
 Saphanodes barclayi Adlbauer, 2016
 Elydnus barclayi Miroshnikov, 2017
 Lophobothea barclayi Monné M.A., Monné M.L. & Botero, 2017
 Dymasius barclayi Miroshnikov, 2018
 Polyzonus barclayi Skale, 2018   
Chrysomelidae
 Cyrtonota maxhowardi Sekerka, 2011 (named for Max and his colleague Howard Mendel)
 Dercetina barclayi Lee & Bezdek, 2013
 Charaea maxbarclayi Bezdek & Lee, 2014
 Diabrotica barclayi Derunkov, Prado, Tishechkin & Konstantinov, 2015
 Doryscus barclayi Lee, 2017
Anthribidae
 Pseudobasidissus barclayi Tryzna & Banar, 2014
 Gymnognathus barclayi Perger & Guerra, 2016 
Rhynchitidae
 Rubroinvolvulus barclayi Legalov, 2009
Brentidae
 Stereodermus barclayi Mantilleri, 2004
 Perapion barclayi Alonso-Zarazaga, 2011 [corrected 2013 from mistyped barkleyi]
Curculionidae
 Maxwelleus Meregalli, 2022
 Barclayanthus Borovec & Skuhrovec, 2019
 Eudraces barclayi Borovec & Nakladal, 2018
 Heisonyx barclayi Borovec, Colonelli & Osella, 2009
 Larinus barclayi Gültekin & Lyal, 2016
 Pachycerus barclayi Meregalli, 2009
 Sphincticraerus barclayi Košťál, 2019
 Titilayo barclayi Cristovao & Lyal, 2018
 Tychius barclayi Caldara, 2011

as well as the wasp Platygaster barclayi Buhl, 2011, the fulgorid bug Polydictya barclayi Constant, 2016 and the fossil cockroach Mesoblatta maxi Hinkelman, 2020.

Personal life
Barclay is married with children. As a teenager he worked as a volunteer at the Durrell Wildlife Park and he cites Gerald Durrell as a significant influence.

References

Living people
British entomologists
Fellows of the Royal Entomological Society
English coleopterists
Employees of the Natural History Museum, London
Year of birth missing (living people)